Maxxx was a general entertainment channel for men owned by Creative Programs, Inc., an ABS-CBN subsidiary.

Channel Information
Maxxx had a test broadcast together with Velvet and Balls (both defunct) since September 2007. Maxxx had an official launch on January 1, 2008. Maxxx has also aired selected shows over UHF channel Studio 23 (now S+A). Maxxx ceased airing on September 30, 2010. Its channel space was replaced by Solar's Jack TV.

Description
Maxxx is the answer of SkyCable after the expiration of the contract of Solar Entertainment's Jack TV. Maxxx is fairly similar in themes and audience with Jack TV typically the male-audience ranging from teens to men. Maxxx features shows based on poker, racing, comedy, adult-themed shows and cartoons and all-time classic old TV series such as Star Trek, Flash Gordon, Lucky Louie and Scrubs.

Shows
 The 4400
 48 Hours
 The Academy
 The Agency
 American Inventor
 Attack of the Show
 Ballbreakers
 Behind the Music that Sucks
 Bikini Destinations
 Bikini Life Adventures
 Boston Legal
 Breaking Bad
 The Bronx is Burning
 Build or Bust
 Bullrun
 CSI: NY
 Camouflage
 Cheat!
 Cheaters
 Cinematech
 Cinematech: Nocturnal Emissions
 The Cleaner
 The Collector
 Combat!
 Crash Test Dummies
 Creature Comforts
 Destination X
 Dexter
 D. E. A.
 The Dead Zone
 Extras
 Exposed
 Fear Factor
 Fear Itself
 Filipino Poker Tour
 Flight of the Conchords
 Flash Gordon
 Frasier
 Freestyle Moto X
 Friday Night Project
 Friday the 13th: The Series
 From the Earth to the Moon
 The Gamekillers
 The Guard
 God, the Devil and Bob
 Ghost Hunters International
 Highlander: The Series
 Hey Joel
 Hot n' Heavy
 How Does That Work?
 The IT Crowd
 IHRA Nitro Jam Series
 International Fight League
 jPod
 John From Cincinnati
 Just Kidding
 Keys to the VIP
 The King of Queens
 Kingdom Hospital
 Lewis Black's Root of All Evil
 Late Show with David Letterman
 Lucky Louie
 Men 7 Show
 Mind of the Married Man
 Mission: Impossible
 Missing
 Mondo Mini Shows
 Modern Toss
 Most Daring
 Most Shocking
 Murder
 NCIS
 Nowhere Man
 Nightmare Ned
 NUMB3RS
 The Nutshack
 Odd Job Jack
 The Office
 Penn & Teller: Bull$#@*!
 Pinks All Out
 Planet Rock Profiles
 Pros vs. Joes
 Ralph TV
 Scrubs
 Sons of Butcher
 South Park
 Sports Action Team
 Stag
 Star Trek
 Stargate: Atlantis
 Street Tuner Challenge
 Stupid, Stupid Man
 Superbikes
 The Real Wedding Crashers
 ReGenesis
 Rome
 Spawn
 Spooks
 Survivor (Borneo to Cook Islands) †
 Tales from the Darkside
 The Twilight Zone
 The Daily Show
 The Colbert Report
 The Lost Room
 The Ultimate Fighter (*)
 The Wild Side
 The Wrong Coast
 Three Sheets
 Ultimate Blackjack Tour
 UFC Unleashed (*)
 UFC Wired (*)
 Unique Whips
 V-Twin TV
 World Poker Tour
 X-Play
 Vroom Vroom
 Wide World of Fights
 World Supercross GP
 World's Wildest Police Videos
 WWE 24/7 PPV Classics

(*) - Now moved to Balls

(†) - This show was first aired on UHF TV channel Studio 23, Later seasons, beginning with Survivor: Fiji to the latest season, This show were moved to Solar Entertainment's flagship multi-media channels: The VHF TV station Solar TV (RPN), cable channel Jack TV, the now-defunct cable channel C/S and C/S Origin, and the previous seasons on Q of GMA Network

Movies and specials
 MAXXX Showtime

References

External links
 Official Multiply Website
 Official Facebook Website

Creative Programs
Television networks in the Philippines
Television channels and stations established in 2008
Television channels and stations disestablished in 2010
Men's interest channels
Defunct television networks in the Philippines
ABS-CBN Corporation channels